The 1856 United States presidential election in Ohio took place on November 4, 1856, as part of the 1856 United States presidential election. Voters chose 23 representatives, or electors to the Electoral College, who voted for president and vice president.

Ohio was won by California Senator John C. Frémont (R–Georgia), running with New Jersey Senator William L. Dayton, with 48.51% of the popular vote, against Senator James Buchanan (D–Pennsylvania), running with Representative and future presidential candidate in the 1860 presidential election John C. Breckinridge, with 44.21% of the popular vote and the 13th president of the United States Millard Fillmore (A–New York), running with the 2nd United States Ambassador to Germany Andrew Jackson Donelson, with 7.28% of the popular vote.

Results

Results by county

See also
 United States presidential elections in Ohio

References

Ohio
1856
1856 Ohio elections